This article will be listing the confirmed squads lists for badminton's 2021 Sudirman Cup. The dates of the rankings that will be stated and to also decide the ranking order for each event are based on the BWF World Ranking on 23 February 2021.

Group A

China 
20 players are scheduled to represent China.

Thailand 
17 players are scheduled to represent Thailand.

Finland 
17 players are scheduled to representing Finland.

India 
12 players are scheduled to representing India.

Group B

Chinese Taipei 
12 players are scheduled to representing Chinese Taipei.
[1]

South Korea 
15 players are scheduled to represent South Korea.

Tahiti 
8 players are scheduled to represent Tahiti.

Germany 
16 players are scheduled to representing Germany.

Group C

Indonesia 
20 players are scheduled to representing Indonesia.

Denmark 
17 players are scheduled to representing Denmark.

NBFR 
8 players are scheduled to representing the NBFR (National Badminton Federation of Russia).

Canada 
6 players are scheduled to represent Canada.

Group D

Japan 
17 players are scheduled to representing Japan.

Malaysia 
18 players are scheduled to representing Malaysia.

England 
13 players are scheduled to representing England.

Egypt 
6 players are scheduled to represent Egypt.

References

External links 

2021 Sudirman Cup
Badminton-related lists